Sayat-Nova Avenue ( Sayat-Nova'i Poghota), is an avenue in the central Kentron District of Yerevan, Armenia. It is named after the 18th-century Armenian poet and musician Sayat-Nova. It was officially inaugurated on 27 October 1963.

The avenue starts with the Marshal Baghramyan Avenue at the northwest and ends up with the Charents street to the southeast.

Notable buildings
Many notable buildings in the city of Yerevan are located on the Sayat-Nova Avenue. Below is a list of the most attractive structures located on the avenue:
Yerevan Komitas State Conservatory
Ani Plaza Hotel
Hovhannes Tumanyan Puppet Theatre of Yerevan

Gallery

References

Transport in Yerevan
Roads in Armenia
Streets in Yerevan